NASA's Pathfinder Technology Demonstrator (PTD) Project will test the operation of a variety of novel technologies on a type of nanosatellites known as CubeSats, providing significant enhancements to the performance of these versatile spacecraft. Each of the five planned PTD missions consist of a 6-unit (6U) CubeSat with expandable solar arrays. 

Flight qualification and demonstration of these technologies are expected to benefit future government and commercial missions. These include propulsion systems and sub-systems that stabilize and point the spacecraft to high accuracy in order to use a laser communications system capable of high-speed broadband.

The first mission, PTD-1, was scheduled for launch in December 2020 on a Falcon 9 rocket, from Cape Canaveral, as part of the ride-share ELaNa mission 35., and launched in Jan 2021.

PTD-3 launched on May 25 2022 on the SpaceX Transporter-5 rideshare.

Overview 
The Pathfinder Technology Demonstrator (PTD) Project is led by NASA's Ames Research Center in California, in collaboration with NASA's Glenn Research Center in Ohio. The PTD project is managed and funded by NASA's Small Spacecraft Technology Program (SSTP) within the Space Technology Mission Directorate. The overall goal is to test the physics of key new technologies in order to enhance small spacecraft and make them able to reach new destinations and operate in new environments. These technologies will be tested in low Earth orbit for potential future application in small spacecraft operating in Earth orbit or in deep space. Technologies demonstrated by PTD flights may be applicable and scalable to larger spacecraft.

The project plans to fly five 6U CubeSat orbital missions, coded PTD-1 through PTD-5, at 6-month intervals, each flight assessing different technologies. Each mission will have a 90-day lifetime after it is released in low Earth orbit. Each spacecraft will include different test payloads such as propulsion systems for orbital station-keeping, maneuvering and interplanetary transit, laser high bandwidth communications, or high precision attitude control (orientation) systems to stabilize the spacecraft and point the designated instruments with high accuracy.

Technology under assessment 
Examples of novel systems to be tested are an electrospray thruster, water-based propulsion, and a very precise attitude control system.
 
 BET-100 μN is a colloid thruster fabricated by Busek that was successfully flown in the ESA LISA Pathfinder mission in 2016. Each thruster requires less than 6 watts of power.

 Attitude Determination and Control System (ADCS), uses Blue Canyon's Hyper-XACT ADCS. The package incorporates a star tracker, 3-4 reaction wheels, three torque rods, a magnetometer, an inertial measurement unit, and up to four Sun sensors. 

 HYDROS is a hybrid chemical/electrical technology to provide propulsion using water. It uses an electrolysis cell to split water propellant into gaseous hydrogen and oxygen that are stored under pressure in separate tanks for burning in a thruster nozzle. This propulsion system is being developed by Tethers Unlimited, Inc.

 The MPS-130 engine by Aerojet Rocketdyne burns a novel ionic liquid propellant called hydroxylammonium nitrate (NH3OHNO3). It is a fuel/oxidizer blend also known as AF-M315E that is about 50% more efficient than traditional hydrazine, and is non-toxic. Aerojet Rocketdyne tested this engine and fuel on a mission called Green Propellant Infusion Mission, launched aboard a SpaceX Falcon Heavy rocket on 25 June 2019, on a test mission called Space Test Program 2.  

 The PTD project will also evaluate the commercial Globalstar communications network for low cost in-space communications for sending commands to spacecraft in low Earth orbit. Each of the five planned spacecraft will incorporate a Globalstar GSP-1720 Duplex Modem.

PTD-1 
A Request for Proposal (RFP) NNA16574335R was issued, on 12 February 2016, for the delivery of a spaceflight qualified 6U CubeSat spacecraft to be operated by NASA for its Pathfinder Technology Demonstrator (PTD) Project to accommodate technology subsystems, hereafter referred to as the payload. One flight demonstration is planned for a low thrust propulsion system with options for four follow-on technology demonstrations. Follow‐on missions may include payloads such as higher thrust propulsion systems or payloads such as optical communications or high precision attitude determination and control systems. Request for proposal response date: 4 April 2016.

The PTD-1 spacecraft is currently under development and fabrication. It will demonstrate a propulsion system with a water-based propellant obtained from electrolysis of water. While in orbit, the system separates onboard water into hydrogen and oxygen propellants by applying an electric current through the water. PTD-1 is scheduled for launch in December 2020 as part of the ride-share ELaNa mission 35 on board a Falcon 9 rocket. 

PTD-1 launched 24 Jan 2021 on SpaceX rideshare Transporter-1 mission.

HYDROS Propulsion test 

HYDROS is a hybrid chemical/electrical technology to provide propulsion using water. It uses an electrolysis cell to split water propellant into gaseous hydrogen and oxygen that are stored under pressure in separate tanks. The system then burns the hydrogen and oxygen mix in a simple thruster nozzle to provide up to 1 Newton and a specific impulse of 258 seconds. This propulsion system is being developed by Tethers Unlimited, Inc.

In pure water, at the negatively charged cathode, a reduction reaction takes place, with electrons (e−) from the cathode being given to hydrogen cations to form hydrogen gas. The half reaction, balanced with acid, is:

Reduction at cathode: 2 H+ (Aqueous solution) + 2e− → H2 (gas)

At the positively charged anode, an oxidation reaction occurs, generating oxygen gas and giving electrons to the anode to complete the circuit:

Oxidation at anode: 2 H2O (liquid) → O2 (gas) + 4 H+ (aqueous solution) + 4e−

Overall reaction: 2 H2O (liquid) → 2 H2 (gas) + O2 (gas)

The propulsion system uses the electricity generated by the solar arrays to power the miniature water electrolysis. The demonstration will test propulsion performance through programmed changes in spacecraft velocity and altitude.

PTD-2

PTD-3 
PTD-3, a 6U cubesat, launched on May 25 2022 on SpaceX's Transporter-5 rideshare mission, includes the TeraByte InfraRed Delivery (TBIRD) laser communications test. TBIRD will send data at 200 Gbps from LEO to ground stations. By Dec 2022, TBIRD demonstrated 100 Gbps data transfers from a 300 mile orbit to Earth, and plans to test 200-1,000 
Gbps.

See also 

 Cislunar Explorers, another spacecraft using water electrolysis to generate propellant
 World Is Not Enough, a spacecraft propulsion system using water harvested in-situ

References

External links 
 PTD-1 NASA video at YouTube

CubeSats
Future SpaceX commercial payloads
Proposed NASA space probes
Laser communication in space
Secondary payloads